Cooch Behar Panchanan Barma University (CBPBU)  is a public state  university in Cooch Behar, West Bengal, India. The university was named after the 19th-century Rajbangshi leader and social reformist, Panchanan Barma.

History
The Government of West Bengal established Cooch Behar Panchanan Barma University under the West Bengal Act XXI of 2012 and The Cooch Behar Panchanan Barma University Act 2012

The first statutes of the university were approved by the chancellor of the university, the Hon'ble Governor of West Bengal, in the first week of January 2015, and subsequently printed. On 8 April 2015, the University Grants Commission, New Delhi, granted it '2(F)' affiliation. The first statutes were gazetted at the end of April 2015, while the first Executive Council meeting was held on 22 May 2015.

The university, which functioned from its camp-office at Central Farmers' Hostel, Uttar Banga Krishi Viswavidyalaya, Pundibari, shifted to its permanent campus on Vivekananda Street, near 'Krishi Bij Khamar', Cooch Behar, on 19 August 2015. Before this, through a July 2015 order from the Department of Higher Education, Government of West Bengal, 15 general-degree colleges, mostly from the district of Cooch Behar, were initially affiliated to the University.

Professor Indrajit Ray, a former teacher of economics of the University of North Bengal, was the first vice-chancellor, while Professor Shubhrangshu Sekhar Chattopadhyay, originally from the Department of Law, University of Calcutta, joined the university as the second vice-chancellor in January 2015. Presently, Prof. Syamal Roy, originally from the Indian Institute of Chemical Biology is officiating as the first permanently appointed vice-chancellor. Dr. Debkumar Mukhopadhyay is the first registrar of Cooch Behar Panchanan Barma University. Mr. Nirupom Bhattacharyya is the (acting) Finance Officer.

Organisation and Administration

Governance
The Vice-chancellor of the Cooch Behar Panchanan Barma University is the chief executive officer of the university. Debkumar Mukhopadhyay is the current Vice-chancellor of the university.

Faculties and Departments
The Cooch Behar Panchanan Barma University has 19 departments organized into two faculty councils.

 Faculty of Science
Thus faculty consists of the departments of Mathematics, Physics, Chemistry, Botany, and Zoology.

 Faculty of Arts & Commerce
This faculty consists of the departments of Bengali, English, Hindi, Sanskrit, History, Political Science, Philosophy, Library and Information Science, Journalism & Mass Communication, Geography, Economics, Education, Law, and Commerce.

Cooch Behar Panchanan Barma University also offers Certificate Course in Rajbongshi language, and Spanish language.

Affiliations
Cooch Behar Panchanan Barma University is an affiliating university and has jurisdiction over the colleges of the Cooch Behar district.  A total of 15 colleges from Cooch Behar district are affiliated with the university.

Academics

Bengali
English
Sanskrit
Hindi
Physics
Chemistry
Mathematics
Botany
zoology
Geography
History
Political Science
Library and information science
Mass communication
Education
Philosophy
Commerce 
Economics
Law 
Pharmacy

Accreditations
The University Grants Commission (U.G.C.) accorded recognition to the university in terms of Section 12B of the U.G.C. Act.

References

External links
Official website

Universities and colleges in Cooch Behar district
Educational institutions established in 2012
2012 establishments in West Bengal
Cooch Behar Panchanan Barma University